Wendy Lumby (born 13 June 1966 in Regina, Saskatchewan) is a Canadian former alpine skier who competed in the 1988 Winter Olympics. She grew up in Calgary, Alberta.

References

External links
 

1966 births
Living people
Sportspeople from Regina, Saskatchewan
British female alpine skiers
Olympic alpine skiers of Canada
Alpine skiers at the 1988 Winter Olympics